Mateo Gil was a Spanish conquistador, who served as alcalde and regidor of Santa Fe, Argentina, during the Viceroyalty of Peru.

Born in Jaraicejo, Gil had arrived at Río de la Plata in the expedition of Álvar Núñez Cabeza de Vaca. In 1573, he participated in the delegation led by Juan de Garay to found Santa Fe and is named as one of the settlement's first regidores.

Mateo Gil also participated in the wars against the indigenous Charrúa people, he is remembered for his extreme cruelty. Although contemporary references don't support this claim.

References

External links 
Acts of the Cabildo of Santa Fe mentioning Mateo Gil
cehsf.ceride.gov.ar
wikispaces.com

Spanish colonial governors and administrators
Explorers of Argentina
Explorers of South America
Spanish conquistadors
People from Asunción
People from Santa Fe, Argentina
Río de la Plata